Mark Strickland (born July 14, 1970) is an American former professional basketball player and coach, who had a career in the NBA from 1995 to 2002 and was the head coach of the Oshawa Power of the National Basketball League of Canada. A 6'9"  forward born in Atlanta, Strickland played college basketball at Temple University, where he also majored in sports management.

As well as playing in the NBA, he also played in the CBA and USBL.

Notes

External links
NBA.com player profile
NBA stats @ basketballreference.com

1970 births
Living people
African-American basketball coaches
Basketball coaches from Georgia (U.S. state)
American expatriate basketball people in China
American expatriate basketball people in France
American expatriate basketball people in Lebanon
American expatriate basketball people in the Netherlands
American men's basketball players
Atlanta Hawks players
Atléticos de San Germán players
Basketball players from Atlanta
Dallas Mavericks players
Denver Nuggets players
Fort Wayne Fury players
Indiana Pacers players
Miami Heat players
New Jersey Nets players
Temple Owls men's basketball players
Undrafted National Basketball Association players
Yakima Sun Kings players
Zhejiang Golden Bulls players
Forwards (basketball)
United States Basketball League players
21st-century African-American sportspeople
20th-century African-American sportspeople